Fantasy Earth: Basic Rules is a role-playing game published in 1994 by Zody Games.

Description
Fantasy Earth: Basic Rules is a 120-page perfect-bound book that describes the Fantasy Earth role-playing game. It is a generic system — there is no world or universe setting, leaving the gamemaster free to create his or her own world.

Character generation
Players assign 10-sided die rolls to 26 attributes such as Strength and Appearance. Over 120 skills are derived from the attributes. The player then chooses a class: Warrior, Sorcerer, Cleric, Shaman or Burglar. The only race available is human.

Skill resolution
To resolve a skill, the gamemaster sets a success level for the task, which the player must then equal or exceed with a die roll added to the character's relevant skill level.

Combat
The combat system uses maneuvers and hit locations to allocate damage that can range from superficial to extreme.

Reception
In the April 1996 edition of Dragon (Issue #228), Rick Swan wondered why any publisher would create a new generic fantasy role-playing game, given the preponderance of Advanced Dungeons & Dragons, but then admitted that "Michael Zody forged ahead anyway, with surprisingly credible results." Swan found the combat system "number-heavy but manageable." He concluded, "I don’t imagine many folks will be abandoning their AD&D Player's Handbook  for Fantasy Earth. But if you’re a supporter of the small press, or if you’re looking for a set of ready-made rules to graft onto a homemade setting, you could do worse than this."

Reviews
 The Familiar (Issue 2, February 1995)

References

Role-playing game books
Role-playing game supplements introduced in 1994